Whitefish/Lake Panache Water Aerodrome  is located on Lake Panache,  south southwest of Whitefish, Ontario, Canada.

References

Registered aerodromes in Ontario
Seaplane bases in Ontario
Transport in Greater Sudbury